Araz Selimov (1 June 1960, Khojaly, Azerbaijan SSR – 26 February 1992, Askeran, Azerbaijan Republic) —  warrior during the Nagorno-Karabakh conflict, National Hero of Azerbaijan and victim of Khojaly massacre.

Early life and education 
Araz Bahadur oglu Selimov was born in Khojaly district on 1 June 1960. In 1975, he finished his education. In 1978, Selimov joined Soviet army and in 1980, he finished his service and came to his hometown. After army years he started working in the collective farm.

Family 
He was married. He had three children. 3 members of his family were killed during Khojaly massacre.

First Nagorno-Karabakh war 
In 1988, Selimov joined Khojaly self-defence battalion. This battalion was created by Azerbaijanis against Armenian attacks. During the Khojaly massacre Selim smuggled dozens of civilians from Khojaly.

Honors 
Araz Selimov was posthumously awarded the title of the "National Hero of Azerbaijan" by Presidential Decree No. 533 dated 25 February 1997.

He was buried at the Agdam Martyrs' Lane.

See also 
 First Nagorno-Karabakh War
 List of National Heroes of Azerbaijan
 Khojaly Massacre

References 

1960 births
1993 deaths
Azerbaijani people of the Nagorno-Karabakh War
National Heroes of Azerbaijan
People from Khojaly District
Victims of the Khojaly massacre